Daniel Onega (born March 17, 1945) is a retired Argentine football player who played most of his career for River Plate. He also played for the Argentina national team between 1966 and 1972. He is the brother of the late midfielder Ermindo Onega.

Onega started his career at River Plate. It was with River Plate that he became the topscorer in the 1966 Copa Libertadores with 17 goals, setting the record for the most goals ever scored in a single season in that tournament, a record that has never been surpassed. He is also the 4th in the all time Copa Libertadores topscorers list with 31 goals in 47 games.

In 1972 Onega moved to Racing Club for a season, but he only managed 9 goals and returned to River the following season.

In 1973, he moved to Spain to play for Córdoba CF in the Spanish 2nd division, he stayed with the club until 1978 when he moved to Millonarios in Colombia. It was with Millonarios that he won his first and only league title. At the end of the 1978 season Onega retired from football.

References

External links

1945 births
Living people
Argentine footballers
Argentina international footballers
Association football forwards
Argentine expatriate footballers
Club Atlético River Plate footballers
Racing Club de Avellaneda footballers
Córdoba CF players
Millonarios F.C. players
Argentine Primera División players
Expatriate footballers in Spain
Expatriate footballers in Colombia
People from Belgrano Department, Santa Fe
Sportspeople from Santa Fe Province